Raninagar Assembly constituency is an assembly constituency in Murshidabad district in the Indian state of West Bengal.

Overview
As per orders of the Delimitation Commission, No. 63 Raninagar Assembly constituency covers Raninagar I community development block, Kalinagar I, Kalinagar II, Malibari I, Malibari II and Raninagar I gram panchayats of Raninagar II community development block and Dhulauri gram panchayat of Domkal community development block.

Raninagar Assembly constituency is part of No. 11 Murshidabad (Lok Sabha constituency).

Members of Legislative Assembly

Election Results

2021
In the 2021 election, Abdul Soumik Hossain of Trinamool Congress defeated his nearest rival, Firoza Begam of Congress.

2016
In the 2016 election, Firoza Begam of Congress defeated her nearest rival, Dr. Humayun Kabir of Trinamool Congress.

2011
In the 2011 election, Firoza Begum of Congress defeated her nearest rival Maksuda Begum of Forward Bloc.

1957–1962
The Raninagar assembly seat existed for a short period in 1957 and 1962. Syed Badruddin, Independent, won in both the years.

References

Assembly constituencies of West Bengal
Politics of Murshidabad district